Upper Pottsgrove Township is a township in Montgomery County, Pennsylvania, United States. The population was 5,315 at the 2010 census.

Geography
It is drained by the Schuylkill River via its tributaries of Sproegels Run and Manatawny Creek. Its villages include Cedar Grove, Halfway House, and Little Oley (also in Berks County).

Neighboring municipalities
Douglass Township, Montgomery County (northeast)
New Hanover Township (east)
Lower Pottsgrove Township (southeast)
Pottstown (south)
West Pottsgrove Township (southwest)
Douglass Township, Berks County (northwest)

Transportation

Pennsylvania Route 100 is the primary highway serving Upper Pottsgrove Township, following a north-to-south alignment across the western and northwestern portions of the township. Pennsylvania Route 663 also brushes the eastern edge of the township.

Pottstown Area Rapid Transit (PART) provides bus service to Upper Pottsgrove Township, with the Purple, Yellow, Green, and Orange lines providing service to Pottstown.

Demographics

As of the 2010 census, the township was 87.6% White, 5.8% Black or African American, 0.2% Native American, 2.4% Asian, 0.1% Native Hawaiian and Other Pacific Islander, 0.5% were Some Other Race, and 2.0% were two or more races. 2.7% of the population were of Hispanic or Latino ancestry.

At the 2000 census there were 4,102 people, 1,417 households, and 1,156 families in the township.  The population density was 812.5 people per square mile (313.6/km2).  There were 1,459 housing units at an average density of 289.0/sq mi (111.5/km2).  The ethnic makeup of the township is 95.20% White, 2.51% African American, 0.24% Native American, 0.90% Asian, 0.27% from other races, and 0.88% from two or more races.  1.02% of the population were Hispanic or Latino.
There were 1,417 households, 40.4% had children under the age of 18 living with them, 72.4% were married couples living together, 6.1% had a female householder with no husband present, and 18.4% were non-families. 14.4% of households were made up of individuals, and 6.3% were one person aged 65 or older.  The average household size was 2.89 and the average family size was 3.22.

The age distribution was 28.7% under the age of 18, 5.7% from 18 to 24, 32.2% from 25 to 44, 22.7% from 45 to 64, and 10.8% 65 or older.  The median age was 37 years. For every 100 females, there were 99.5 males.  For every 100 females age 18 and over, there were 95.5 males.

The median household income was $70,500 and the median family income  was $75,019. Males had a median income of $46,006 versus $33,875 for females. The per capita income for the township was $25,607.  About 1.7% of families and 2.6% of the population were below the poverty line, including 4.5% of those under age 18 and 4.3% of those age 65 or over.

Government and politics

Legislators
State Representative Tracy Pennycuick, Republican, 147th district
State Senator Bob Mensch, Republican, 24th district
US Representative Madeleine Dean, Democrat, 4th district

Board of Commissioners
Trace Slinkerd, President
Cathy Paretti, Vice President 
Hank Llewellyn
Don Read
Dave Waldt

Polling Place
Pottsgrove Middle School
1351 N. Hanover St. 
Pottstown, PA 19464

References

Townships in Montgomery County, Pennsylvania
Townships in Pennsylvania